Chris Senn may refer to:

Chris Senn (skateboarder)
Chris Senn (video game designer), best known for the unfinished Sonic X-treme project